Nogometni klub Partizan Slovenj Gradec, commonly referred to as NK Partizan or simply Partizan, was a Slovenian football club which played in the town of Slovenj Gradec. The team was dissolved in 1995. ND Slovenj Gradec, which was officially founded in 2004, is legally not considered to be the successor of NK Partizan and the statistics and honours of the two clubs are kept separate by the Football Association of Slovenia.

References

Association football clubs established in 1978
Association football clubs disestablished in 1995
1978 establishments in Slovenia
Defunct football clubs in Slovenia
1995 disestablishments in Slovenia